Feerfeer District is a district in the eastern Hiiraan region of Hirshabelle State, Somalia.  The town is located 40 km northeast of Beledweyne And is inhabited by Hawadle.

Districts of Somalia